Elytropappus rhinocerotis (commonly known as renosterbos or "rhinoceros bush") is a species of flowering plants in the daisy family, Asteraceae, endemic to South Africa. It is a very obvious component of the unique Renosterveld Vegetation Type, which is named after this bush.

Distribution
Although the Renosterveld Vegetation Type is confined to the South-Western Cape of South Africa, the Renosterbos plant is much more widespread - occurring throughout the Cape Floristic Region and further, as far east as Molteno in the Eastern Cape, and as far north as Namibia. Renosterbos is also relatively common in this area, unlike most plants associated with Renosterveld vegetation.

As a consequence of livestock finding the plant relatively inedible, the Elytropappus rhinocerotis has spread in heavily grazed areas and increased in numbers relative to other (more easily grazed) plants.

Uses
Elytropappus rhinocerotis is a medicinal plant in traditional African medicine. The young tips of the branches are used in traditional medicine to treat indigestion and stomach ulcers. The foliage tips are now usually added to wine or brandy for such medicinal consumption.

Cultivation
Elytropappus rhinocerotis is cultivated as an ornamental plant for South African native plant, drought tolerant, and wildlife gardens. It is also planted in natural landscaping and habitat restoration projects.

A cultivar, which has a strikingly crisp, pure-white colour, is usually grown in gardens more than the direct species.

References

External links

PlantZAfrica.com treatment: Elytropappus rhinocerotis

Gnaphalieae
Endemic flora of South Africa
Plants described in 1832
Plants used in traditional African medicine
Garden plants of Africa
Drought-tolerant plants